Project Runway is a reality competition television format created by Eli Holzman that originated with the American TV show Project Runway, which premiered in December 2004.

International adaptations

Countries highlighted in red indicate a version of the show that is no longer airing.

References 

Project Runway
Reality television series franchises